Trang Municipality Stadium or Trang Provincial Stadium is a multi-purpose stadium in Trang Province, Thailand. It is currently used mostly for football matches and is the home stadium of Trang F.C.

Multi-purpose stadiums in Thailand
Trang province